The list of ship launches in 1779 includes a chronological list of some ships launched in 1779.


References

1779
Ship launches